David Pospíšil (born May 9, 1970) is a Czech former professional ice hockey forward.

Pospíšil played 708 games in the Czech Extraliga, playing for HC Pardubice, HC Plzeň and HC Vítkovice. He also played 24 games in the Russian Superleague for SKA Saint Petersburg during the 2003–04 season.

References

External links

1970 births
Living people
Czech ice hockey forwards
HC Dynamo Pardubice players
BK Mladá Boleslav players
IHC Písek players
HC Plzeň players
SKA Saint Petersburg players
Sportspeople from Pardubice
HC Tábor players
HC Vítkovice players
HC Chrudim players
Czechoslovak ice hockey forwards
Czech expatriate ice hockey players in Russia